Phylica polifolia, also called rosemary or Saint Helena rosemary, is a species of plant in the family Rhamnaceae. It is endemic to Saint Helena.  Its natural habitats are rocky areas and rocky shores.

References

Flora of Saint Helena
polifolia
Critically endangered plants
Taxonomy articles created by Polbot